Marjan Mladenovic (born August 27, 1987) is a Macedonian professional basketball player who plays for EuroNickel 2005.

References

1988 births
Living people
Macedonian men's basketball players
Point guards
Macedonian people of Serbian descent
Sportspeople from Veles, North Macedonia